Motella, Metello(u)polis, or Pulcherianopolis was a city in the Roman province of Phrygia Pacatiana, in Asia Minor, probably on the site of the modern Medele.

Inscriptions make known a Phrygian town named Motella, which name is connected with the Phrygian feminine proper name Motalis and the Cilician masculine Motales, as also with Mutalli, or Mutallu, the name of an ancient Hittite king of Northern Commagene. One of these inscriptions was found in the village of Medele, which evidently preserves the ancient name. 

Motella seems to be the town which Hierocles calls Pulcherianopolis.

Ecclesiastical history

Motella may be supposed to have been raised to the rank of a bishopric by the Empress Pulcheria (414-53). Shortly before 553, perhaps in 535, the Emperor Justinian raised Hierapolis to metropolitan rank, and attached to it a certain number of suffragan sees previously dependent on Laodicea. Among these the Notitiae Episcopatuum mention, from the ninth to the twelfth or thirteenth century, this same Motella, which they call Metellopolis, and even once Metallopolis. 

An inscription informs us of Bishop Michael, in 556; and another, of Bishop Cyriacus, perhaps in 667. At the Council of Nicaea in 787, the see was represented by Eudoxius, a priest and monk. Bishop Michael attended the two councils of Constantinople in 869 and 879.

The bishopric of Metellopolis is included in the Catholic Church's list of titular sees. In 1660 Ignace Cotolendi (1630-62) was appointed titular bishop of Metellopolis (Medele) with jurisdiction over three provinces of northeastern China, Tartary, and Korea.

References 

 Le Quien, Oriens Christianus, I, 826 (very incomplete); 
 William Mitchell Ramsay, Cities and Bishoprics of Phrygia, 109, 121, 141, 158, 541.

External links 
 
 Catholic Hierarchy page

Attribution

Populated places in Phrygia
Populated places of the Byzantine Empire
Roman towns and cities in Turkey
Catholic titular sees in Asia
History of Denizli Province
Defunct dioceses of the Ecumenical Patriarchate of Constantinople